Tilman Schirmer is a structural biologist and Professor at the Biozentrum of the University of Basel.

Life 
Tilman Schirmer studied physics at the Universities of Konstanz and Vienna, and at the Ludwig Maximilian University of Munich. In 1985 he earned his doctorate at the Max Planck Institute for Biochemistry in Martinsried. He subsequently conducted research at the MRC Laboratory of Molecular Biology in Cambridge, England. In 1989, Tilman Schirmer joined the Biozentrum, University of Basel, initially as a group leader and was appointed as Associate Professor of Structural Biology in 1997. He reached emeritus status in 2020.

Work 
Tilman Schirmer investigates the mechanism of action of bacterial proteins based on their spatial structures, which are determined using X-ray crystallography.  This has provided insights into light harvesting in photosynthetic antenna complexes, the allosteric regulation of phosphofructokinase and the translocation of small molecules through the porins of the outer membrane.
As of 2013, Tilman Schirmer’s research group at the Biozentrum in Basel is studying the mechanisms of signal transduction of the messenger substrate cyclic di-GMP and the structure-function relationships of bacterial effector proteins with AMP-transferase activity. The goal is the elucidation of fundamental biological interrelationships on the molecular level.

Awards and honors 
1986 Otto Hahn Medal of the Max Planck Society
1988 Long-Term Fellowship of the European Molecular Biology Organization (EMBO)

References

External links 
 
 

Living people
21st-century German biologists
University of Konstanz alumni
University of Vienna alumni
Ludwig Maximilian University of Munich alumni
Academic staff of the University of Basel
University of Basel alumni
Biozentrum University of Basel
Year of birth missing (living people)
20th-century German biologists